Marc Anthony Logan (born May 9, 1965) is a former American football running back that played NCAA D1-A before playing in the National Football League (NFL).

Marc weighs in at 6'0, 228 lbs. Marc attended the University of Kentucky in college wearing the number 25. At Kentucky, Marc enjoyed four very successful seasons, leading his team in receptions in his Sophomore, Junior and Senior years. As a Sophomore in the 1985 Hall of Fame Bowl, Marc scored two touchdowns on just five plays in his MVP performance, setting two NCAA bowl records for the longest kick return (85 yards) as well as the longest play from scrimmage (63 yards). His kickoff return record still stands today. 

Marc was selected in the fifth round of the 1987 NFL Draft by the Cincinnati Bengals. He then went on to play eleven years in the NFL from 1987 to 1997 for the Bengals, Miami Dolphins, San Francisco 49ers and Washington Redskins. Throughout his career Marc rushed for 1,391 yards on 325 carries, averaging 4.4 yards per carry with 15 touchdowns. Marc also had 123 receptions for 1,135 yards, averaging 9.2 yards per reception with 3 touchdowns. He also added 1,830 yards on 89 returns, averaging 20.6 yards, with 1 touchdown. He played in Super Bowl XXIII for the Bengals and was a part of the Super Bowl XXIX winning San Francisco 49ers.

1965 births
Living people
American football running backs
Kentucky Wildcats football players
Cincinnati Bengals players
Miami Dolphins players
Players of American football from Lexington, Kentucky
San Francisco 49ers players
Washington Redskins players
National Football League replacement players